The 2010 Bancolombia Open is a professional tennis tournament played on indoor red clay courts. It is part of the 2010 ATP Challenger Tour. It took place in Bogotá, Colombia between 5 and 12 April 2010.

Singles main draw entrants

Seeds

Rankings are as of March 22, 2010.

Other entrants
The following players received wildcards into the singles main draw:
  Juan Sebastián Cabal
  Carlton Fiorentino
  Juan Sebastián Gómez
  Eduardo Struvay

The following players received entry from the qualifying draw:
  Martín Alund
  Attila Balázs
  Arnau Brugués-Davi
  Guido Pella

Champions

Singles

 João Souza def.  Alejandro Falla, 4–6, 6–4, 6–1

Doubles

 Franco Ferreiro /  Santiago González def.  Dominik Meffert /  Philipp Oswald, 6–3, 5–7, [10–7]

References
 2010 Draws
 Official website
 ITF search 

Bancolombia Open
Bancolombia Open
2010 in Colombian tennis